Gaynor is an unincorporated community in Nodaway County, in the U.S. state of Missouri.

History
A former variant name was "Gaynor City". A post office called Gaynor City was established in 1879, the name was changed to Gaynor in 1895, and the post office closed in 1903. The community has the name of Edward Gaynor, a local tradesman.

References

Unincorporated communities in Nodaway County, Missouri
Unincorporated communities in Missouri